Alima is a genus of shrimps belonging to the family Squillidae, and was first described in 1817 by William Elford Leach.

Leach describes the genus as

Species 
Species accepted by the World Register of Marine Species are:

 Alima hieroglyphica (Kemp, 1911)
 Alima hildebrandi (Schmitt, 1940)
 Alima maxima Ahyong, 2002
 Alima neptuni (Linnaeus, 1768)
 Alima orientalis Manning, 1978
 Alima pacifica Ahyong, 2001

References

Taxa named by William Elford Leach
Crustaceans described in 1817
Stomatopoda